Fireproof means resistant to damage from fire.

Fireproof may also refer to:

Music
 Fireproof (Dawn Landes album), 2008
 Fireproof (Pillar album) or the title song, 2003
 Fireproof (That Petrol Emotion album), 1993
 "Fireproof" (Coleman Hell song), 2016
 "Fireproof", a song by One Direction from Four, 2014
 Fireproof Recording, a New York City recording studio

Other uses
 Fireproof (film), a 2008 American Christian drama film
 Fireproof Building, a historic structure in Charleston, South Carolina
 Fireproof Studios, a British video game art studio and developer
 XXXchurch.com or Fireproof Ministries, a non-profit Christian website

See also
List of fire-retardant materials